Morgan Llywelyn (born December 3, 1937) is an American-Irish historical interpretation author of historical and mythological fiction and historical non-fiction. Her interpretation of mythology and history has received several awards and has sold more than 40 million copies, and she herself is recipient of the 1999 Exceptional Celtic Woman of the Year Award from Celtic Women International.

Biography
Llywelyn was born Sally Snyder in New York in 1937. She was the daughter of Joseph John (an attorney) and she attended high school in Dallas. In her teens, Llywelyn moved to the Dallas area, where she developed a love of horses. By the age of 16, Llywelyn was competing in professional horse shows across the United States. By age 18, she modeled for Neiman Marcus and Arthur Murray. After 15 years of experience as a horse trainer and instructor, she tried out for and narrowly missed making the 1976 United States Olympic Team in dressage. She was instead shortlisted, missing the cut off score by .05 percent.

With her mother's encouragement and a successfully published article on horse training, she refocused her efforts in tracing the Llywelyn family history and eventually made a career out of writing historical novels that allowed the exploration of her Celtic roots. In reference to this career change, Llywelyn had this to say:

I have a strong strain of Welsh on my mother's side, which does indeed go back to Llywelyn ap Iorwerth. And Llywelyn the Great! (We have the proven genealogy from the College of Heralds.) She was very proud of her royal Welsh connection. That is why she was so interested in genealogy in the first place, and inspired me to get involved as well ... leading in turn to THE WIND FROM HASTINGS. But both my parents were predominantly Irish – my father totally so – and I spent half the years of my childhood here. So I have always been much more interested in Ireland and its history and legends.

Llywelyn has received several awards for her works. She received the Novel of the Year Award from the National League of American Penwomen for her novel, The Horse Goddess, as well as the Woman of the Year Award from the Irish-American Heritage Committee for Bard: The Odyssey of the Irish. The latter award was presented to her by Ed Koch, then-mayor of New York City.

Although Llywelyn's grandparents have their roots in Ireland, it was only after the death of her parents and her husband in 1985 that she relocated to Ireland. Llywelyn now lives outside Dublin and has become an Irish citizen.

In 1990, Llywelyn began her focus on writing books geared for younger readers. These works started with Brian Boru: Emperor of the Irish, for which she won an Irish Children's Book Trust Bisto Award in 1991, and includes other titles, such as Strongbow: The Story of Richard and Aoife, for which she won a Bisto Award in the Historical Fiction category, 1993 and the Reading Association of Ireland Award, 1993, and Star Dancer, which departed from her usual Celtic topic and was centered on her experiences with dressage. Further works include The Vikings in Ireland, an exploration of when the Norsemen arrived in Ireland, and Pirate Queen, a younger reader's version of the story of Grace O'Malley, told through letters from Granuaile to her beloved son.

Bibliography

Novels and short fiction collections 
1978 The Wind from Hastings, Tor Books, 
1980 Lion of Ireland, Forge Books, 
1983 The Horse Goddess, Tor Books, 
1984 Bard: The Odyssey of the Irish, Tor Books,  
1984 Personal Habits, Doubleday
1986 Grania: She-King of the Irish Seas, Forge Books, 
1987 Xerxes, Chelsea House Publications, 
1989 The Isles of the Blest, Olmstead Press, 
1989 Red Branch, Ivy Books, 
1990 Brian Boru: Emperor of the Irish, Tor Books, 
1989 On Raven's Wing, Mandarin, 
1991 Druids, Del Rey, 
1992 The Last Prince of Ireland: A Novel, W. Morrow, 
1992 O'Sullivan's March
1993 The Elementals, Tor Books, 
1993 Star Dancer, The O'Brien Press, 
1994 Finn Mac Cool, Forge Books,   
1995 Cold Places
1995 Ireland: A Graphic History (with Michael Scott)
1995 Silverhand (Arcana, Book 1; with Michael Scott), Baen, 
1996 19 Railway Street (with Michael Scott), Poolbeg Press Ltd, 
1996 The Vikings in Ireland
1996 Strongbow: The Story of Richard & Aoife, The O'Brien Press, 
1996 Silverlight (Arcana, Book 2; with Michael Scott)
1996 Pride of Lions
1998 1916, A Novel Of the Irish Rebellion, Forge Books,  
1999 The Essential Library for Irish Americans
2000 Etruscans (with Michael Scott), Tor Books, 
2000 A Pocket History of Irish Rebels
2000 The Earth Is Made Of Stardust, Borgo Press, 
2001 1921, The War for Independence, Forge Books,  
2001 Granuaile, The Pirate Queen (republished as Pirate Queen in 2006), The O'Brien Press, 
2003 1949, The Irish Republic, Forge Books, 
2005 1972, A Novel of Ireland's Unfinished Revolution, Forge Books, 
2006 The Greener Shore: A Novel of the Druids of Hibernia, Del Rey, 
2006 The Young Rebels, The O'Brien Press, 
2006 The History of Irish Rebels
2006 The Vikings in Ireland
2008 1999 - A Novel of the Celtic Tiger and the Search for Peace, Forge Books, 
2010 Brendan - The Remarkable Life and Voyage of Brendan of Clonfert, Forge Books, 
2012 Cave of Secrets, The O'Brien Press, 
2013 After Rome, Forge Books,  
2014 1014: Brian Boru & the Battle for Ireland, Dover Publications, 
2016 Only the Stones Survive, Forge Books,  
2018 Drop by Drop, Tor Books,  
2019 Step by Step
2020 Inch by Inch, Tor Books,  
2021 Breath by Breath, Tor Books,

Awards

References

External links
 The Official Morgan Llywelyn Website – "owned by the Morgan Llywelyn Completist Society" (archived December 2013)
 
 
 Shannon Lewis at LC Authorities, with 1 record

1937 births
Living people
20th-century American novelists
21st-century American novelists
American female models
American fantasy writers
American historical novelists
American people of Welsh descent
Irish fantasy writers
Irish historical novelists
Irish people of Welsh descent
Writers of historical fiction set in the Middle Ages
American women novelists
20th-century American women writers
21st-century American women writers